Mazzer is a village in the commune of Igli, Algeria, in Béchar Province, Algeria. The village lies on the Oued Saoura south of Igli and north of Béni Abbès.

References

Neighbouring towns and cities

Populated places in Béchar Province